Cerobates is a genus of beetles belonging to the family Brentidae.

Species 
 Cerobates elegans
 Cerobates enganoënsis
 Cerobates fleutiauxi
 Cerobates pidigala
 Cerobates pygmaeus
 Cerobates sennae
 Cerobates sulcatus
 Cerobates tristriatus

References 

 Sforzi A, Bartolozzi L. Brentidae of the World (Coleoptera, Curculionoidea). Museo Regionale di Scienze Naturali, 2004 s. 433

Brentidae
Weevil genera